The Maria Farinha Formation is a geological formation of the Parnaíba Basin in Pernambuco, northeastern Brazil whose strata date back to the Danian stage of the Paleocene, or Tiupampan in the SALMA classification.

The formation comprising limestones, dolomites, marly and sandy limestones has been deposited in a shallow marine platform environment.

The formation has provided fossils of reptiles and fish.

Description 
The Maria Farinha Formation crops out in the Parnaíba Basin in the northeastern state of Pernambuco of Brazil. The formation registers the Cretaceous-Paleogene boundary at the base of the formation, where it overlies the Maastrichtian Gramame Formation.

Fossil content 
The following fossils were reported from the formation:
 Reptiles
 Turtles
 Inaechelys pernambucensis
 Tethysuchians
 Guarinisuchus munizi
 Hyposaurus derbianus
 Dyrosauridae indet.
 Fish
 Chondrichthyes
 Apocopodon sericeus
 Myliobatis dixoni

See also 

 South American land mammal ages
 Guabirotuba Formation, Late Eocene formation of the Curitiba Basin
 Itaboraí Formation, Early Eocene formation of the Itaboraí Basin
 Lefipán Formation, Danian formation of Argentina
 Santa Lucía Formation, Tiupampan type formation of Bolivia

References

Bibliography 

 
 
 
 
 
 

Geologic formations of Brazil
Paleocene Series of South America
Paleogene Brazil
Danian Stage
Tiupampan
Limestone formations
Dolomite formations
Shallow marine deposits
Fossiliferous stratigraphic units of South America
Paleontology in Brazil
Formations